Ameiva fuliginosa is a species of teiid lizard found on Isla de Providencia, San Andrés, and the Swan Islands.

References

Ameiva
Reptiles described in 1892
Taxa named by Edward Drinker Cope